{{DISPLAYTITLE:C14H10O}}
The molecular formula C14H10O (molar mass: 194.23 g/mol) may refer to:

 Anthrone
 Anthrol
 Dibenzoxepin
 Diphenylketene
 1-Hydroxyphenanthrene, a human metabolite of phenanthrene